Brad Vis  (born in 1984) is a Canadian politician who was elected to represent the riding of Mission—Matsqui—Fraser Canyon in the House of Commons of Canada in the 2019 Canadian federal election, and re-elected in 2021. He is the member of the Conservative Party of Canada.

Vis worked in government, politics and the agri-business sector before being elected to Parliament. He holds a bachelor's degree in political science from the University of British Columbia and a master's degree in political science from Carleton University.

Electoral record

References

External links
 

Living people
Conservative Party of Canada MPs
Members of the House of Commons of Canada from British Columbia
21st-century Canadian politicians
Year of birth uncertain
1984 births